Täljö is a locality situated in Österåker Municipality, Stockholm County, Sweden with 387 inhabitants in 2010.

References 

Populated places in Österåker Municipality